Kingsland may refer to:

Places
Barbados
 Kingsland, Barbados (in Christ Church, Barbados Parish)
Canada
 Kingsland, Calgary, Alberta, a neighborhood
Australia
 proposed alternative name for the Northern Territory in 1912
New Zealand
 Kingsland, New Zealand
 Kingsland railway station, New Zealand
Wales
 Kingsland, Anglesey, Wales
England
 Kingsland, Dorset, England
 Kingsland, Herefordshire, England
 Kingsland, London, England
 Kingsland Basin
 Kingsland Road
 Kingsland, Shropshire (Shrewsbury)
 Kingsland Bridge
United States
 Kingsland, Arkansas
 Kingsland, Georgia
 Kingsland, Indiana
 Kingsland, New Jersey
 Kingsland, Texas
 Kingsland (Chimney Corner, Virginia), listed on the National Register of Historic Places in Chesterfield County, Virginia
 Kingsland Holdings, a company in the Bahamas

People
Kingsland is also a British surname.
 Ambrose Kingsland (1804-1878), mayor of New York City
 Gerald Kingsland (1930-2000), British writer
 Paddy Kingsland (1947-present), British composer

See also
 Kingsland Road (band) (formerly Kingsland), English boy band